The Egnatiinae are a subfamily of grasshoppers in the family Acrididae, found in central and South America, and based on the monotypic type genus Egnatius and erected by Bey-Bienko in 1951.  Species have been recorded from parts of Africa, the Middle East and Asia, including Russia and China (but distribution may be incomplete).

Tribe and genera
The Orthoptera Species File includes:
tribe Egnatiini Bey-Bienko, 1951
 Bienkonia Dirsh, 1970
 Charora Saussure, 1888
 Egnatiella Bolívar, 1914
 Egnatioides Vosseler, 1902
 Egnatius Stål, 1876
 Ferganacris Sergeev & Bugrov, 1988
 Paracharora Fishelson, 1993
 Paregnatius Uvarov, 1933
Unassigned to tribe
 Leptoscirtus Saussure, 1888

References

External Links 
 

Orthoptera subfamilies
Acrididae
Orthoptera of Africa
Orthoptera of Asia